Vorobeichik, Vorobeytschik, Barabeitchik and other variants derived from  is a Jewish family name. Literally it means "little sparrow", however it is not a standard diminutive, which would be "vorobyshek"/"vorobushek". A similarly constructed surname is Soloveichik ("little nightingale"). Notable people with the surname include:

Issay Dobrowen (1891-1953), born  Itschok Barabeitchik,  Russian/Soviet-Norwegian pianist, composer and conductor
Moi Ver (1904-1995), born Moses Vorobeichic, Israeli photographer and painter
Yevgeny Vorobeichik, general director of Russian oil company 

Orderly Vorobeichik, a character from the 1960 Soviet film Probation
Inspector Venceslas Vorobeychik from the 1942 French comedy thriller The Murderer Lives at Number 21
Midshipman Vorobeichik, a character in the novel Tsushima by Alexey Novikov-Priboy

A branch of this family moved to Mexico in the 1920’s and the last name was changed to 
“Berebichez”. There are several prominent members of the family.

Jewish surnames